The Wau Ecology Institute (WEI) was established in 1961 near the town of Wau, Papua New Guinea, in Morobe province, as a field station of the Bishop Museum.  In 1973 it became an independent environmental organisation.  It has laboratory space for visiting scientists, a herbarium and zoological reference collections. The Institute ceased operations around 2007 and is now run as a local coffee plantation by former employees and area gold miners.

Publications
Some publications of the WEI are:
 Menzies, J.I. (1975). Handbook of Common New Guinea Frogs.  WEI Handbook No.1.  Wau Ecology Institute: PNG.
 Lamb, K.P.; & Gressitt, J.L. (eds). (1976). Ecology and Conservation in Papua New Guinea.  WEI Pamphlet No.2.  Wau Ecology Institute: Wau, PNG.
 Gressitt, J.L.; & Hornabrook, R.W. (1977). Handbook of Common New Guinea Beetles.  WEI Handbook No.2.  Wau Ecology Institute: Wau, PNG.
 Simon, Martin. (1977). Guide to Biological Terms in Melanesian Pidgin.  WEI Handbook No.3.  Wau Ecology Institute: Wau, PNG.
 Beehler, Bruce McP. (1978). Upland Birds of North-eastern New Guinea. A guide to the hill and mountain birds of Morobe Province.  WEI Handbook No.4.  Wau Ecology Institute: Wau, PNG.
 Gressitt, J.L.; & Nadkarni, Nalini. (1978). Guide to Mt Kaindi. Background to montane New Guinea ecology.  WEI Handbook No.5.  Wau Ecology Institute: Wau, PNG.
 Menzies, J.I.; & Dennis, Elizabeth. (1979). Handbook of New Guinea Rodents.  WEI Handbook No.6.  Wau Ecology Institute: PNG.
 McCoy, Michael. (1980). Reptiles of the Solomon Islands.  WEI Handbook No.7.  Wau Ecology Institute: Wau, PNG.
 Hadden, Don. (1981). Birds of the North Solomons.  WEI Handbook No.8.  Wau Ecological Institute: Wau, PNG.
 Beehler, Bruce McP.; Pratt, Thane K.; & Zimmerman, Dale Allen. (1986). Birds of New Guinea.  WEI Handbook No.9.  Wau Ecology Institute: Wau, PNG. Princeton University Press: Princeton, NJ, USA.

References

External links
Wau Ecology Institute

Biological research institutes
Former research institutes
Environmental organisations based in Papua New Guinea
1961 establishments in Papua New Guinea
Research institutes established in 1961
Research institutes disestablished in 2007